Don’t Tell (That Sweet Ole Lady of Mine) is the eighth album by American country singer/songwriter  Johnny Carver, released in 1974 on the ABC Records label. The title track, "Don’t Tell (That Sweet Ole Lady of Mine)", reached #10 in the Billboard Country Chart and #47 in the Canadian Country Charts. Another single from the album, "January Jones", reached #39 in the US Country Charts. The album itself reached #23 in the Country Albums chart.

Track listing

Side 1
"Don’t Tell (That Sweet Ole Lady of Mine)" (L. R. Brown/I. Levine) – 2:39
"I Think I’m Falling in Love" (Johnny Carver) – 2:07
"Did We Even Try" (Johnny Carver/Ron Chancey) – 2:38
"(The Likes of) Louise" (C. Taylor) – 2:26
"There Ain’t no Way, Babe" (Rice/Riis/Fields) – 2:40

Side 2
"It Ain’t no Little Thing" (D. Burgess/D. Pfrimmer) – 2:48
"Immediate Possession" (R. Bourke/R. Chancey) – 2:35
"January Jones" (R. Bourke) – 3:01
"Seven Times Last Week" (R. Griff) – 2:24
"World in My Arms" (J. Adrian) – 3:30

Musicians

Steel Guitar: Lloyd Green
Dobro: Jerry Shook, Jimmy Capps, Jim Colvard
Electric Guitar: Jimmy Capps
Rhythm Guitar: Chip Young, Johnny Christopher
Electric Bass Guitar: Tommy Allsup
Piano: Hargus "Pig" Robbins, Larry Butler
Bass: Bob Moore, Curtis Young
Drums: Buddy Harman
Harmonica: Charlie McCoy
Organ: Ron Oats, Charlie McCoy
Vibes: Ron Oates
Strings: Gary Vanosdale, Marvin Chantry, Martha McCrory, Carl Gorodetzky, Stephanie Wolfe, Lennie Haight, George Binkley III, Byron T. Bach, Brenton B. Banks & Sheldon Kurland.
String Arrangements on “January Jones”: Bergen White
Background Vocals: The Nashville Edition (Hurshel Wiginton, Delores Edgin, Joe Babcock, Sharon Vaughn & Ricky Page)

Production

Producer: Ron Chancey 
Recorded at Woodland Sound Studios, Nashville, Tennessee
Recording Engineers: Tom Semmes, Rex Collier & David McKinley
Backup Engineer: Pat Higdon
Mixer: Tom Semmes
Mastering Engineer: Bob Sowell
Album Photography: Ken Kim

References

1974 albums
ABC Records albums
Johnny Carver albums